The Battle of Guadalacete was fought in 852 between a coalition of troops from the Kingdom of Asturias and the Kingdom of Navarre, and a force of troops from the Muslim Emirate of Córdoba under the command of Muhammad I of Córdoba. The outcome was a Muslim victory.

Context 
After the death of Emir Abd ar-Rahman II in the year 852, the population in the area around Toledo rose in revolt as they had done on many previous occasions. Their reasons were both internal, such as corrupt governance, and external as they identified more with the Christian kingdoms to the north. They also frequently were harassed by the Mozárabes people who resided in the Muslim borderlands. Hence, the people of Toledo rose in arms, seeking the assistance of the Kingdom of Asturias and Basques as is reported by Ibn Khaldun, quoting verbatim from Spanish-language chronicles of the tenth century:

The battle 
The organized forces of Muhammad I were easily able to rout the town rabble and their Christian men at arms from Asturias and Navarre. They were however, unable to take the actual city for another 7 years.

Consequences 
After the Toledan and Asturian forces were defeated at Guadalacete, Muhammad I failed to capture the city. The rebellion, which was inspired by the Christian clergy and aided by the Muladi, was prolonged until the year 858 due to a continued desire for independence from Cordoba. In 858 Muhammad finally conquered the city and jailed Bishop Eugenio; he was executed the following year.

See also 
 Reconquista
 Muhammad I of Córdoba
 Emirate of Córdoba
 Kingdom of Asturias

References 

 
 

Guadalacete
Guadalacete
Guadalacete
Guadalacete
9th century in Al-Andalus
852
Toledo, Spain
History of the province of Toledo